This is a list of 118 species in Augochlora, a genus of sweat bees in the family Halictidae.

Augochlora species

 Augochlora albiceps Friese, 1925 i c g
 Augochlora albiplantis (Vachal, 1911) i c g
 Augochlora alcyone Smith, 1879 i c g
 Augochlora alexanderi Engel, 2003 i c g
 Augochlora amphitrite (Schrottky, 1909) i c g
 Augochlora antillana Cockerell, 1910 i c g
 Augochlora antonita Michener, 1954 i c g
 Augochlora ardens (Vachal, 1911) i c g
 Augochlora aticreis (Vachal, 1911) i c g
 Augochlora atrispinis (Vachal, 1911) i c g
 Augochlora aurifera Cockerell, 1897 i c g
 Augochlora aurinasis (Vachal, 1911) i c g
 Augochlora azteca (Vachal, 1911) i c g b  (Aztec augochlora)
 Augochlora bodkini Cockerell, 1923 i c g
 Augochlora bogotensis (Vachal, 1911) i c g
 Augochlora brachyops (Vachal, 1911) i c g
 Augochlora bractealis (Vachal, 1904) i c g
 Augochlora braziliensis (Vachal, 1911) i c g
 Augochlora buscki Cockerell, 1910 i c g
 Augochlora caerulescens Friese, 1921 i c g
 Augochlora caerulior Cockerell, 1900 i c g
 Augochlora cephalica (Moure, 1941) i c g
 Augochlora chiriquiana Michener, 1954 i c g
 Augochlora clarki Michener, 1954 i c g
 Augochlora cordiaefloris Cockerell, 1907 i c g
 Augochlora cupraria Friese, 1925 i c g
 Augochlora cyaneoviridis Ashmead, 1900 i c g
 Augochlora cydippe (Schrottky, 1910) i c g
 Augochlora cylix (Vachal, 1911) i c g
 Augochlora cymatoides (Vachal, 1911) i c g
 Augochlora daphnis Smith, 1853 i c g
 Augochlora decorata (Smith, 1853) i c g
 Augochlora detudis (Vachal, 1911) i c g
 Augochlora diaphractes (Vachal, 1911) i c g
 Augochlora dolichocephala (Moure, 1941) i c g
 Augochlora dorsualis (Vachal, 1911) i c g
 Augochlora ectasis (Vachal, 1911) i c g
 Augochlora engys (Vachal, 1911) i c g
 Augochlora erubescens Cockerell, 1923 i c g
 Augochlora esox (Vachal, 1911) i c g
 Augochlora euryale (Schrottky, 1906) i c g
 Augochlora feronia Smith, 1879 i c g
 Augochlora foxiana Cockerell, 1900 i c g
 Augochlora francisca Schrottky, 1902 i c g
 Augochlora fugax (Vachal, 1904) i c g
 Augochlora fulgidana Friese, 1925 i c g
 Augochlora fulvilabris Friese, 1917 i c g
 Augochlora glabricollis Friese, 1917 i c g
 Augochlora haitiensis (Vachal, 1911) i c g
 Augochlora hallinani Michener, 1954 i c g
 Augochlora holti Cockerell, 1927 i c g
 Augochlora ignifera Crawford, 1914 i c g
 Augochlora igniventris (Vachal, 1911) i c g
 Augochlora iheringi Cockerell, 1900 i c g
 Augochlora isthmii Schwarz, 1934 i c g
 Augochlora jamaicana Cockerell, 1909 i c g
 Augochlora jugalis (Vachal, 1911) i c g
 Augochlora labrosa (Say, 1837) i c g
 Augochlora laevipyga (Kirby, 1890) i c g
 Augochlora laneifrons (Vachal, 1911) i c g
 Augochlora leprieuri (Spinola, 1841) i c g
 Augochlora leptis (Vachal, 1911) i c g
 Augochlora lethe (Schrottky, 1909) i c g
 Augochlora liapsis (Vachal, 1911) i c g
 Augochlora lorenzinis Strand, 1910 i c g
 Augochlora lyoni Cockerell, 1918 i c g
 Augochlora magnifica Cresson, 1865 i c g
 Augochlora matucanensis Cockerell, 1914 i c g
 Augochlora micans (Moure, 1940) i c g
 Augochlora microchlorina Cockerell, 1949 i c g
 Augochlora microsticta Moure, 1943 i c g
 Augochlora morrae Strand, 1910 i c g
 Augochlora mourei Michener, 1954 i c g
 Augochlora mulleri Cockerell, 1900 i c g
 Augochlora nausicaa (Schrottky, 1909) i c g
 Augochlora neivai (Moure, 1940) i c g
 Augochlora neottis (Vachal, 1911) i c g
 Augochlora nigrocyanea Cockerell, 1897 i c g
 Augochlora nominata Michener, 1954 i c g
 Augochlora notialis (Vachal, 1904) i c g
 Augochlora obscuriceps Friese, 1925 i c g
 Augochlora oedesis (Vachal, 1911) i c g
 Augochlora pachytes (Vachal, 1911) i c g
 Augochlora patruelis (Vachal, 1911) i c g
 Augochlora perimelas Cockerell, 1900 i c g
 Augochlora phanerorhina Cockerell, 1930 i c g
 Augochlora phoemonoe (Schrottky, 1909) i c g
 Augochlora phoenicis (Vachal, 1911) i c g
 Augochlora pinacis (Vachal, 1911) i c g
 Augochlora plutax (Vachal, 1911) i c g
 Augochlora posadensis (Schrottky, 1914) i c g
 Augochlora praeclara Cresson, 1865 i c g
 Augochlora punctibasis (Vachal, 1911) i c g
 Augochlora pura (Say, 1837) i c g b  (pure green augochlora)
 Augochlora pyrgo (Schrottky, 1910) i c g
 Augochlora pyrrhias (Vachal, 1911) i c g
 Augochlora quiriguensis Cockerell, 1913 i c g
 Augochlora regina Smith, 1853 i c g
 Augochlora repandirostris (Vachal, 1911) i c g
 Augochlora rightmyerae Engel, 2000 i c g
 Augochlora rohdei (Vachal, 1911) i c g
 Augochlora seitzi Cockerell, 1929 i c g
 Augochlora semiramis (Schrottky, 1910) i c g
 Augochlora sidaefoliae Cockerell, 1913 i c g
 Augochlora smaragdina Friese, 1917 i c g
 Augochlora sphaerites (Vachal, 1911) i c g
 Augochlora sporas (Vachal, 1911) i c g
 Augochlora styx (Schrottky, 1909) i c g
 Augochlora tantilla Moure, 1943 i c g
 Augochlora thalia Smith, 1879 i c g
 Augochlora thaliana Strand, 1910 i c g
 Augochlora thebe (Schrottky, 1909) i c g
 Augochlora thusnelda (Schrottky, 1909) i c g
 Augochlora townsendi Cockerell, 1897 i c g
 Augochlora transversalis Sandhouse & Cockerell, 1924 i c g
 Augochlora vincentana Cockerell, 1910 i c g
 Augochlora viridinitens Cockerell, 1931 i c g
 Augochlora xesis (Vachal, 1911) i c g

Data sources: i = ITIS, c = Catalogue of Life, g = GBIF, b = Bugguide.net

References

Augochlora